Iliya Asenov Georgiev (born 25 July 1925) was a Bulgarian basketball player. He competed in the men's tournament at the 1952 Summer Olympics.

References

External links
 

1925 births
Possibly living people
Bulgarian men's basketball players
Olympic basketball players of Bulgaria
Basketball players at the 1952 Summer Olympics
Place of birth missing